Joan Fischer Targ (July 8, 1937 – June 2, 1998) was an American educator who was an early proponent of computer literacy and initiated peer tutoring programs for students of all ages.

As a child, she bought her younger brother, Bobby Fischer, his first chess set and taught him how to play the game.

Early life
Joan Fischer was born in Moscow, Soviet Union in 1937 to Hans-Gerhardt Fischer, a German-born biophysicist, and his wife, Regina Wender Fischer, a Swiss-born naturalized American citizen of Russian-Jewish and Polish-Jewish ancestry.

Regina Fischer left Moscow because of the persecution of Jews in the 1930s, bringing her child with her to the United States. She spoke seven languages fluently and was a teacher, registered nurse and eventually a physician.

After living in several cities in various parts of the United States, in 1948 the family moved to Brooklyn, where Regina worked as an elementary school teacher and nurse. One year later, in Brooklyn, Joan taught her younger brother, future chess world champion Bobby Fischer, to play chess.

Proponent of computer education
Targ founded a number of programs to study the teaching of computer literacy, including programs in the Palo Alto Unified School District, as well as the Institute of Microcomputing in Education at Stanford University.

Her educational techniques included the creation of peer tutoring systems whereby a student, trained by peers in a basic course in computer programming, would then tutor the next students. In the early 1980s, she created and led a programs sponsored by Stanford University in which elementary school teachers were taught the basics of programming by high school students.

One focus of her work was bringing computer literacy to girls, senior citizens, and other groups that were underrepresented in computing.

She coauthored the book Ready, run, fun: IBM PC edition with Jeff Levinsky.

Personal life
Targ later lived in Palo Alto, California and Portola Valley, receiving a Master's degree in education from the College of Notre Dame, Belmont, California. Her husband, Russell Targ, worked at SRI International as a parapsychologist, and her daughter, Elisabeth, also became a parapsychologist.

Joan Targ was noted for her activism for organic farming, having built an organic farm soon after she married Russell Targ in 1958. In 1976, she, her husband, and another family bought 80 acres of land in Portola Valley they hoped to turn into another such farm; a lawsuit from her neighbors attempting to block this use was settled in her favor shortly before her death.

Death
Joan Fischer Targ died of a cerebral hemorrhage in Portola Valley at the age of 60 in 1998.

In popular culture
In the 2014 Bobby Fischer biopic Pawn Sacrifice, Targ was portrayed by Lily Rabe, with Sophie Nélisse appearing as the teenage Joan.

References

Additional sources
 Anything to Win: The Mad Genius of Bobby Fischer, television documentary, produced by Frank Sinton and Anthony Storm

1937 births
1998 deaths
People from Brooklyn
20th-century American educators
American people of Russian-Jewish descent
American people of Polish-Jewish descent
Notre Dame de Namur University alumni
Stanford Graduate School of Education faculty
People from Palo Alto, California